Front Line Kids is a 1942 British comedy film directed by Maclean Rogers and starring Leslie Fuller. It was made at the Riverside Studios in Hammersmith. The film's sets were designed by the art director Andrew Mazzei.

In wartime London an unruly group of boys assist an incompetent hotel porter to thwart a gang of criminals operating out of the building.

Cast
  Gerald Rex as Bert Wragg
 Leslie Fuller as Nobby Clarkson
 John Singer as Ginger Smith
 John Tacchi as Front Line Gang Member
 Marion Gerth as Elsa la Rue
 David Keir as The Parson
 George Pughe as Pinski
 Anthony Holles as Hotelier
 Ralph Michael as Paul
 Ben Williams as Porter
 Norman Pierce as P.C. Rozzer
 Eric Clavering as Carl
 Vi Kaley as Mrs. Lowther
 Nora Gordon as Evacuee organiser
 Brian Fitzpatrick as Front Line Gang Member
 Derek Prendergast as Front Line Gang Member
 Gerald Moore as Front Line Gang Member 
 Michael John as Front Line Gang Member 
 David Anthony as Front Line Gang Member
 Norah Black 
 O. B. Clarence as 'Real' Clergyman
 Vincent Holman as Police Sergeant 
 Kay Lewis as Receptionist 
 Douglas Stewart as Hotel Guest

References

Bibliography
 Chibnall, Steve & McFarlane, Brian. The British 'B' Film. Palgrave MacMillan, 2009.

External links

1942 films
British comedy films
1942 comedy films
Films set in London
Films directed by Maclean Rogers
British black-and-white films
Films scored by Percival Mackey
1940s English-language films
1940s British films